Anne S. Ferro (born 1958; Baltimore) is an American government official, currently serving as President and CEO of the American Association of Motor Vehicle Administrator, a nonprofit organization creating model programs in motor vehicle administration, law enforcement, and highway safety. She previously served as president of the Maryland Motor Truck Association, administrator of the United States Federal Motor Carrier Safety Administration, and as administrator of the Maryland Motor Vehicle Administration of the Maryland Department of Transportation.

Ferro’s focus on truck driver’s safety during her time as administrator of the United States Federal Motor Carrier Safety Administration is perhaps her most notable work. Ferro emphasized using real-time data on driver behavior to minimize trucker-related accidents, she also fought against excessive disciplining of truck drivers. As Ferro once said during a 2011 interview with the Journal of Commerce, “It’s all about the driver”.

References 

Living people
United States Department of Transportation officials
St. John's College (Annapolis/Santa Fe) alumni
University of Maryland, College Park alumni
Obama administration personnel
1958 births